Great Lakes Christian College (GLCC) is a private Christian college in Delta Charter Township, Michigan. It was founded in 1949 and is supported by and affiliated with the Christian Churches and Churches of Christ.

History
The school was founded as Great Lakes Bible College in 1949 at Rock Lake, Michigan, near Vestaburg, with a student body of 12. In 1951, the college purchased a nearby farm, which was converted into the first campus. The college subsequently moved to the Dodge Mansion in Lansing in 1958. In 1972, the college purchased forty-seven acres of land in Delta Township and built the new campus there.

In 1992, the College changed its name to Great Lakes Christian College. In March 2008, GLCC dedicated its new multi-purpose facility, the Doty Center, named in honor of the late Dr. Brant Lee Doty. The Knowles Learning Center, which includes a faculty offices and a conference room, was constructed in 2011.

Academics
GLCC has been accredited by the Higher Learning Commission since 2003. It was accredited by the Association for Biblical Higher Education from 1977 until it withdrew from the organization in 2016. 

The school's student to faculty ratio is ~13:1 and 80% of the faculty have obtained or are pursuing their professional doctorates. Students at GLCC study for a bachelor's in theology concurrently with their selected major. The campus is home to the Doty Center (a multi-purpose athletics facility), three dormitory buildings and an administration building, which contains faculty offices, classrooms, and the school library.

The school's curriculum is based around its Bible/Theology major which all four-year students attain upon graduation; most pursue second majors as well. The college also offers some online classes and degrees.

Athletics
The school offers men's and women's basketball, men's and women's soccer, women's volleyball, cross country and disc golf in the Mideast Region of Division II of the National Christian College Athletic Association.

References

External links
Official website

Association for Biblical Higher Education
Private universities and colleges in Michigan
Universities and colleges affiliated with the Christian churches and churches of Christ
Education in Lansing, Michigan
Bible colleges
Educational institutions established in 1949
Evangelicalism in Michigan
1949 establishments in Michigan